Eberconazole is an antifungal drug.  As a 1% topical cream, it is an effective treatment for dermatophytosis, candidiasis, and pityriasis.

It was approved for use in Spain in 2015 and is sold under the trade name Ebernet.  It is also approved for use in Panama, Guatemala, Costa Rica, Honduras, and the Dominican Republic.

References 

Imidazole antifungals
Lanosterol 14α-demethylase inhibitors